Vassilis Papadopoulos (alternate spellings: Vasilis, Vasileios) (Greek: Βασίλης Παπαδόπουλος; born December 28, 1998) is a Greek professional basketball player for Ermis Lagkada of the Greek B Basket League. He is a 2.02 m (6' 7") tall shooting guard-small forward.

Professional career
Papadopoulos joined the youth teams of PAOK Thessaloniki in the summer of 2016. In December of the same year, he signed his first professional contract with the senior men's team of PAOK. In 2017, he was loaned to the Greek club Aermis Agias. On September 12, 2020, Papadopoulos signed with Ermis Lagkada.

References

External links
FIBA Champions League Profile
Eurobasket.com Profile
Greek Basket League Profile 
Greek Basket League Profile 
PAOK Profile

1998 births
Living people
Larisa B.C. players
Greek men's basketball players
HANTH B.C. players
P.A.O.K. BC players
Shooting guards
Small forwards
Basketball players from Thessaloniki